Arefeh Mansouri (born November 8, 1980) is an Iranian fashion and costume designer.
Her work has appeared in magazines such as Vogue, Elle, WWD, Marie Claire, InStyle among others.

Early life and education 
Mansouri was born November 8, 1980, in Tehran, Iran, and immigrated to Canada at 16. During her early years, Mansouri displayed great interest and aptitude in painting. She started her undergraduate education with a major in biology at Concordia University with the intent to pursue a career in medicine. She began her studies of fashion at Montreal's LaSalle College. In 2016 Mansouri received an "Executive Education" from Harvard University, John F. Kennedy School of Government.

Career
Mansouri launched a women's prêt-à-porter line until she was offered a position in Milan, Italy as head designer for an Italian clothing firm. In 2007, she relaunched her line in the United States with a specific focus on Couture Wedding and Evening wear. In addition, she began pursuing her passion for costume design and had pieces featured in Hollywood productions. Mansouri is a member of The Academy of Television Arts & Sciences and the Costume Designers Guild as a costume designer. In 2009, Mansouri was asked to collaborate with Entertainment Weekly and Women in Film to design tote bags for the Emmy Awards pre-party.

In 2011, Mansouri created a dress based on Karel Appel's Sculpture the Tulip. In 2012, Mansouri collaborated with Juan Pont Lezica to recreate a photograph of Sir Fredric Leighton's painting the Flaming June. The picture was exhibited at The Parthenon, Nashville's Art Museum.

In 2013, Mansouri established her signature store, "AREFEH", at 150 Worth Avenue in Palm Beach, Florida. In 2016, she relocated her store to Miami's Coral Gables, Florida.

In 2014, Mansouri was invited by Women's Wear Daily and Magic to attend a three-day trade show at WWDMAGIC, in Las Vegas, to show her latest collection.

In 2015, Mansouri was included in the bestseller Jewels of Allah The Untold Story of Women in Iran, written by Nina Ansary. In 2016, Mansouri was nominated for National Design Awards by Cooper-Hewitt, National Design Museum.

In 2017, Mansouri was awarded Second Prize in Apparel Category Competition for the Couture and Avant Garde Wedding Apparel Project at the International Design Awards.

Flat Plat
Mansouri is one of the youngest inventors to be granted a U.S. patent in the area of women's shoes. "Flat Plat" is a flat shoe that uses a proprietary outsole that is engineered for maximum comfort and support. On 5 May, 2015, Mansouri was awarded a US patent for her invention.

Filmography 
 Utopia (2015) Costume Designer
 Drunk Wedding (2015) Costume Designer 
 Time Out of Mind (2014) Set Dressing
 Song One (2014) Set Dressing
 So Undercover (2012) Costumes
 The Brass Teapot (2012) Costumes
 What's Your Number? (2011) Costumes
 The Bling Ring (2011) Wardrobe
 Beauty & the Briefcase (2010) Costumes

References

External links 
 
 
Costume Designer Arefeh Mansouri on Costume Designers Guild

1980 births
Living people
People from Tehran
Canadian fashion designers
Iranian fashion designers
Canadian people of Iranian descent
Canadian costume designers
Iranian costume designers
Wedding dress designers
Iranian women company founders
Patent holders
Harvard Kennedy School alumni
Shoe designers
Canadian women fashion designers
Iranian women fashion designers